The Detroit Building is a high-rise office building located at 2210 Park Avenue, in Downtown Detroit, Michigan.

Description
The building was constructed in 1923, and stands at 10 floors in height. It was designed in the Beaux-Arts architectural style. 
 Architects: Arnold & Shreve
 The building was named originally named the Detroit Life Insurance Company Building after the building's main tenant, which occupied the top four floors.
 This building became part of the Park Avenue Historic District in 1997.

The building is to be renovated as part of the new hockey arena district announced in 2013.

References

External links
Official Detroit Building website
Google Maps location of Detroit Building

Skyscraper office buildings in Detroit
Downtown Detroit
National Register of Historic Places in Detroit
Office buildings on the National Register of Historic Places in Michigan
Historic district contributing properties in Michigan
Beaux-Arts architecture in Michigan

Office buildings completed in 1923